John William may refer to:

Given name
John William, Duke of Jülich-Cleves-Berg (1562–1609)
Johann Wilhelm, Duke of Saxe-Weimar (1530–1573)

People
John William, Baron Ripperda (1680–1737), political adventurer and Spanish prime minister
John William (MP for Dartmouth), see Dartmouth
John William (MP for Southwark), see Southwark

See also

John Williams (disambiguation)